Thomas Sautner (born 1970 in Gmünd, Lower Austria) is an Austrian painter and writer.

Biography
Thomas Sautner studied political science, communication and contemporary history. Then he worked as journalist. Sautner is a painter and a novelist. In his novels he writes about the life and the culture of the Yeniche people. He lives and works in the northern Waldviertel of Austria and in Vienna.

Sautner's first two novels, published in 2006 and 2007, dive into the world of the Yeniche people. Reviewer Eva Riebler of the Austrian literary magazine Etcetera pinpoints to the author's intention to "save the wisdom of the Yeniche people", even comparing the first book to The Little Prince of Antoine de Saint-Exupéry. In Austria, Sautner's books are regarded as bestsellers.

Works
Fuchserde, novel. Picus Verlag, Vienna 2006; Aufbau Verlag, Berlin 2008
Milchblume, novel. Picus Verlag, Vienna 2007
Fremdes Land, novel. Aufbau Verlag, Berlin 2010

References

External links
 
 Literaturhaus Wien: Biography of Thomas Sautner 
 Critical review of Milchblume  by Martina Wunderer (Literaturhaus Wien).
 Critical review of Fremdes Land .
 Kreativ-Atelier Thomas Sautner 
 Book presentation Fuchserde of the Association of the Yeniche People in Germany and Europe 
 Critical review of Fuchserde  by Eva Riebler (Literary magazine Etcetera)
 Austrian television ORF on Thomas Sautner and the novel Fuchserde 
 Article and interview of the Austrian daily newspaper Kurier from 15 September 2010 

1970 births
Living people
People from Gmünd, Lower Austria
Austrian male writers
German-language writers
Yenish people